John de Mirjian (4 July 1896 – 24 September 1928) was an Armenian American glamour photographer, based in New York, and famous for his images of celebrities, sometimes in risque poses. His brother Arto de Mirjian continued the business after John's early death.

Biography

John de Mirjian was a glamour photographer in New York City; his studio was at 1595 Broadway. His fame began in 1922 and ended when he was killed in a car accident in New York in 1928; he was driving a Peerless roadster on the Jericho Turnpike in Long Island at 70 miles per hour, accompanied by the Broadway actress Gloria Christy, when he lost control and the vehicle left the road. He published most of his work in the magazines Art Lovers and Artists and Models. His brother Arto continued the photographic business until 1950.

He gained notoriety when the actress Louise Brooks sued him to prevent publication of his risque portraits of her.

Works

See also
	 
 Elmer Russell Ball

References

External links

 Artnet (6 of his artworks)
 La Petite Melancolie (2 artworks)
 Lusadaran (2 artworks)
 MutualArt (2 artworks)

1896 births
1928 deaths
20th-century American photographers
American people of Armenian descent
Road incident deaths in New York City